The 2012–13 SV Ried season is the 112th season in club history.

Review and events

Matches

Legend

Bundesliga

League results and fixtures

League table

Overall league table

Summary table

ÖFB-Cup

UEFA Europa League

Qualifying rounds

Second qualifying round

Third qualifying round

Squad

Squad and statistics

|}

Transfers

In

Out

Sources

Ried
Ried
SV Ried seasons